Kleinberg may refer to:

 Jon Kleinberg, an American computer scientist, brother of Robert
 Robert Kleinberg, an American computer scientist, brother of Jon
 Kleinburg, Ontario, a small unincorporated village located in Ontario, Canada